Looper may refer to:

Animals
 Cabbage looper (Trichoplusia ni), a member of the moth family Noctuidae
 Inchworm, of the insect order Lepidoptera, the moths and butterflies

People
 Looper (surname), a Dutch-language surname with the meaning "runner"

Other uses
 Looper, a (usually electronic) tool for creating music loops
 Looper, a person traveling the Great Loop, the circumnavigation of Eastern North America by water
 Looper (band),  a Scottish indie pop band
 Looper (film), a 2012 American science fiction film
 Looper (website), a film, television, and video game news website owned by ZergNet
 "Looper", a song by Joe Satriani from his album What Happens Next
 Tape loop, loops of magnetic tape used to create repetitive, rhythmic musical patterns or dense layers of sound when played on a tape recorder

See also
 Loopers, a 2021 Japanese video game

Animal common name disambiguation pages